Confraternities in Nigeria are secretive student groups within Nigerian higher education that have been involved in violence and organized crime since the 1980s. The exact death toll of confraternity activities is unclear.  One estimate in 2002 was that 250 people had been killed in campus cult-related murders in the previous decade, while the Exam Ethics Project lobby group estimated that 115 students and teachers had been killed between 1993 and 2019.

History

Origin 

In 1952, author Wole Soyinka (later a Nobel Prize winner) and a group of six friends formed the Pyrate Confraternity at the elite University College, Ibadan, then part of the University of London. They dubbed themselves "Magnificent Seven"(G7). Soyinka and his confraternity peers observed that the university was dominated by wealthy students associated with the colonial government and a few poorer students who often mimicked the wealthy students; meanwhile, campus social life was dictated by tribal affiliation.

Soyinka would later note that the Pyrates wanted to differentiate themselves from "stodgy establishment and its pretentious products in a new educational institution different from a culture of hypocritical and affluent middleclass, different from alienated colonial aristocrats".  The organization adopted the motto "Against all conventions", used the skull and crossbones as their logo, while members adopted pirate-themed confraternity names such as "Cap'n Blood" and "Long John Silver".

When fellow students protested a proposal to build a railroad across the road leading to the university, fearing that easier transportation would make the university less exclusive, the Pyrates successfully ridiculed the argument as elitist.  Roughly analogous to the fraternities and sororities of North America, the Pyrates Confraternity proved popular among students, even after the original members moved on.  Membership was open to any promising male student, regardless of tribe or race, but selection was stringent and most applicants were denied.  For almost 20 years, the Pyrates were the only confraternity on Nigerian campuses.

Schism 
In the late 1960s, campuses were roiled by the Nigerian Civil War. Details are contested, but it appears that in 1972 former Provost of Adeniran Ogunsanya College of Education, Dr Bolaji Carew, and Kunle Adigun discontinued their membership to the Pyrates confraternity. Reasons gathered are that the Pyrates failed to practice what they stood for and failed to uphold the creed, and several illegal activities went unchecked. In 1972, at the University of Ibadan, orders had ceased to be orders, each and every creed of the Pyrates Confraternity was turned upside down with corruption and nepotism assuming exalted positions therein. The whistle of disintegration which had started to blow within the Pyrates Confraternity reached a crescendo. A cadre of supposed Super Pyrates were violating the confraternity’s creed with impunity, tribalism, clannishness and petty alliances were being enshrined in the confraternity. These excesses gave rise to chaos, anarchy, ridicule, suspension  and expulsion.

Two young gentlemen concluded that the Pyrates confraternity had failed them, leaving to form a new brotherhood to reverse the wrongdoings of the Pyrates. These gentlemen - Dr. Bolaji Carew and Kunle Adigun - chose the name of their new confraternity with specific intent. Referring to the book “Fanny”, they knew that Buccaneers were meant to be society`s roving policemen, who are naturally and morally superior to all seafaring creatures - Hence, the name SEALORD. In reaction to this and other events, the Pyrates registered themselves under the name National Association of Seadogs (NAS) and, at least one source states, pulled the confraternity out of the universities. Dr Bolaji Carew et al. found the Supreme Buccaneers Confraternity.

A major impetus for the creation of new confraternities was the fact that members of the new groups simply did not meet the high academic and intellectual standards, although not necessarily true as sources claimed that prospective members of The Buccaneer Confraternity must demonstrate high academic performances, must uphold high intellectual standards and be of good conduct. However, more fingers were pointed at failed leadership within the Pyrate's fraternal order, with the conclusion that the original organization had lost its core values and purpose of creation. Many Pyrates later denounced their membership and joined the Buccaneers for failed leadership reasons. Subsequently, Soyinka would later point to individuals who became accustomed to exerting power in the rigidly hierarchical confraternity, and were unwilling to give it up, as to blame for the initial schism.  As new groups formed, inter-group tensions led to fighting, though these were initially limited to fistfights.

The Supreme Eiye Confraternity 1958 later metamorphosed into National Association of Airlords (NAA) in 1963 was formed in the University of Ibadan, making it the second oldest confraternity after the Pyrate Confraternity. In the 1980s confraternities spread throughout the over 300 institutions of higher education in the country.  The Neo-Black Movement of Africa (also called Black Axe) emerged from the University of Benin in Edo State. In 1983 students at the University of Calabar in Cross River State founded the Eternal Fraternal Order of the Legion Consortium (the Klan Konfraternity), the Supreme Vikings Confraternity (the Adventurers) the following year.

This time period saw a drastic change in the role of the confraternities.  The coup of Ibrahim Babangida in 1983 caused a large degree of political tension.  Military leaders, beginning in the 1980s, began to see the confraternities as a check on the student unions and university staff, who were the only organized groups opposing military rule.  The confraternities were thus provided payment and weapons to use against student activists, though the weapons were often used in deadly inter-confraternity rivalries.

Sociologist Emeka Akudi noted that some university vice-chancellors protected confraternities which were known to be violent and used them to attack students deemed troublesome.  During this period the confraternities introduced a new tradition of carrying out traditional religious practices, including Vodun, before any other activity.  Perhaps in reaction to the changes, in 1984 Wole Soyinka declared that the Seadogs should not operate on any university campuses.

Expansion from the universities 
In the early 1990s, confraternity activities expanded dramatically in the Niger Delta as confraternities engaged in a bloody struggle for supremacy. The Family Confraternity (the Campus Mafia or the Mafia), which modeled itself after the Italian Mafia emerged. Shortly after their arrival, several students were expelled from Abia State University for cheating and "cultism", a reference to the voodoo-practicing confraternities, which marked the beginning of a shift of confraternity activities from the university to off campus.

The consolidation of confraternity activities outside Nigerian University campuses was boosted by the nationwide renouncement of cultism by university students and the breakdown of traditional campus cults all over the country as a result of amnesty granted to all renounced cultists at the onset of the present democratic government. This led to migration of cultists from the campuses to residential neighborhoods and streets as campuses were no longer a safe haven for them.

Incompetence of government officials and inadequate facilities to police campuses by University Authorities led to the resurgence of cultism in the campuses as renounced cultists who could not be protected by the law, went back to their cult groups to seek protection from rival groups who had discerned their identity as a result of the renouncement ceremony. This resulted in a situation where cult groups were now well established in- and outside the campuses.

The Brotherhood of the Blood (also known as Two-Two (Black Beret)), another notorious confraternity, was founded at Enugu State University of Science and Technology. Another cult, the Victor Charlie Boys, was established by Augustine Ahiazu when he was vice-chancellor of the Rivers State University of Science and Technology. The cults established in the early 1990s are legion; they include Second Son of Satan (SSS), Night Cadet, Sonmen, Mgba Mgba Brothers, Temple of Eden, Trojan Horse, Jurists, White Bishops, Gentlemen Clubs, Fame, Executioners, Dreaded Friend of Friends, Eagle Club, Black Scorpion, Red Sea Horse and Fraternity of Friends.

The Klansmen Konfraternity expanded its influence by creating a "street and creek" wing, Deebam, to fight for and control territory outside of the universities through violence and crime. In response, the Supreme Vikings Confraternity (SVC) established its own street and creek group, Deewell. When Deewell was unable to match Deebam, the SVC created a second confraternity wing, the Icelanders (German), which would eventually be led by militia leader Ateke Tom. The Outlaws, another well-known street and creek confraternity, began as a splinter group of the Icelanders (German).

In the late 1990s, all-female confraternities began to be formed. These include the Black Brazier (Bra Bra), the Viqueens, Daughters of Jezebel, and the Damsel. Female confraternities have supplied spies for allied male confraternities as well as acting as prostitution syndicates.

In the past few years, members of confraternities such as the Neo-Black Movement have been investigated by law enforcement in different countries around the globe, i.e. Canada, the UK and Italy.

Obafemi Awolowo University murders 

On July 10, 1999, one of the most notable single attacks occurred at Obafemi Awolowo University (OAU) in Ife.  OAU had been considered one of the safest universities in the country, largely due to student-organized resistance to the confraternities.  After one cult member was shot and killed during an attempted kidnapping in 1991, the confraternities appeared to stay away from the university.  In February 1999, student leaders organized a campus-wide search, which found eight secret cult members who were stockpiling machine guns and other weapons in their dorm room.  This enraged the Black Axe confraternity, who organized a murder squad that hacked the student union secretary-general to death in his bed and targeted other student leaders.

In a student assembly called the following day, the president of the Students' Union, who had escaped the killers by leaping from his window, demanded the resignation of Vice-Chancellor Wole Omole, who was seen as obstructing efforts to fight confraternities, such as by refusing to expel the eight cultists who had been found stockpiling weapons.  A bounty of 10,000 naira (US$30) was offered for his capture and one vigilante group reportedly abducted Omole's wife as ransom for his surrender. Students also manned checkpoints and carried out searches for cult members still on campus, arresting suspects.  In one case, students worried about police leniency stormed a police station to re-seize a suspect they had previously turned over.

Nigerian Education Minister Tunde Adeniran later dismissed Omole and ordered university administrators to eradicate confraternities from their campuses by September 1999.  In response, hundreds of cult members publicly renounced their confraternity and cult-associated violence temporarily subsided.

Current situation 
During the first weeks of the school year, confraternity alumni and members swarm campuses recruiting new members.  Initiation ceremonies normally involve severe beatings, in order to test their endurance, as well as ingestion of a liquid mixed with blood.  Male initiates may sometimes be required to pass an additional hurdle before becoming full members, including raping a popular female student or a female member of the university staff.  Among the all-female Jezebels or Amazons, prospective members may be required to undergo six rounds of rough sexual intercourse or fight with a group of women or against a much stronger man.  Cults also charge annual membership fees of between 10,000 (US$80) and 30,000 naira.

Frequent criminal activity for cults include intimidating professors into giving high grades, including by burning their cars or briefly abducting their children.  Since the 1980s, confraternities have murdered people who are thought to have 'stolen' a member's girlfriend, or "sugar daddy" in the case of female groups.  Female groups began operating as prostitution rings relatively early. The majority of confraternities, as of 2005, were engaged in a variety of money-making criminal activities, ranging from cybercrime to armed robbery and kidnapping.  Cult members may also get money from political figures, who wish to intimidate their opponents.

The exact death toll of confraternity activities is unclear.  One estimate in 2002 was that 250 people had been killed in campus cult-related murders in the previous decade, while the Exam Ethics Project lobby group estimated that 115 students and teachers had been killed between 1993 and 2003. However those figures pale into insignificance when compared with recent cult activities in Benin city, the Edo state capital in 2008 and 2009, with over 40 cult related deaths recorded monthly.

In the Niger River delta, confraternities are deeply enmeshed in the conflict in the oil-rich delta.  Most of the campus cults have been accused of kidnapping foreign oil workers for ransom, while many of the militant groups, such as the Movement for the Emancipation of the Niger Delta (MEND), employ confraternity members as combatants; Soboma George, head of street and creek confraternity The Outlaws, is also a MEND commander.

Campus cults also offer opportunities to members after graduation.  As confraternities have extensive connections with political and military figures, they offer excellent alumni networking opportunities.  The Supreme Vikings Confraternity, for example, boasts that twelve members of the Rivers State House of Assembly are cult members.

See also
 Crime in Nigeria
 Operation Wetie

References 

 , 
 Rotimi, Adewale. , Nordic Journal of African Studies 14(1): 79–98 (2005)

External links
Social movement or international criminal network? Investigation on the Neo-Black Movement
nbmarena.org, official website
Archived news articles on Nigerian campus cults religionnewsblog.com
Discussion board on Nigerian death fraternities
Video of documentary on Nigerian campus cults by Wole Soyinka
Story of a former cult member
Cult War I
Cult War II
Campus Cults I
Campus Cults II
Campus Cults III
UNHCR about NBM
Movie about Nigerian Cults on YouTube

 
Organized crime groups in Nigeria
Student societies in Nigeria
Confraternities
African secret societies